can refer to two closed railway stations all in Chiyoda, Tokyo, Japan. One was a railway station on the Japanese Government Railways Chūō Main Line and the other was a subway station in the Tokyo Subway network.

Both stations were closed by 1943, though trains and subway cars still pass through them. The stations took their name from the nearby bridge, Manseibashi. The railway station was located on the south bank of the Kanda River, while the subway station was located on the north bank. The area north of the bridge is known as "Akihabara Electric Town". Some train enthusiasts have dubbed Manseibashi station "the phantom station".

Government railway station
The old Manseibashi Station on the Chūō Main Line of Japanese Government Railways was in the Kanda Ward (now part of Chiyoda Ward), and is located between Ochanomizu Station and Kanda Station.
Location:

History

The private  between Tachikawa and Shinjuku was opened on April 11, 1889. The line was gradually extended east towards the center of Tokyo and was nationalized on October 1, 1906. The line was further extended to Manseibashi Station, which was opened on April 1, 1912 and remained the eastern terminal station of the line for seven years.

The first station building was designed by Tatsuno Kingo in a style inspired by the Amsterdam Centraal and repeated in his design of Tokyo Station, opened two years later. A statue of Takeo Hirose was erected in front of the station.

After the 1914 opening of Tokyo Station, Manseibashi still served as the eastern terminal station of the Chūō Main Line until March 1, 1919, when the line was further extended and Kanda Station opened. The 1923 Great Kantō earthquake destroyed the original station building, and a simpler station building was erected in its place. The statue of Hirose was left standing.

In 1925, the elevated railway running through Ueno Station and Akihabara Station was opened for passenger traffic. Since both Akihabara and Kanda stations were within walking distance of Manseibashi, passenger numbers at Manseibashi decreased. On April 26, 1936, the Railway Museum moved into Manseibashi Station, and the station building itself was scaled back in November 1936. The station was officially closed on November 1, 1943 and the station building was completely torn down. The statue was removed after World War II.

Closure and redevelopment
The train line continues to run through the site, and it is used for parking the occasional train. The Tokyo Railway Museum became the Transportation Museum in 1971, and continued to operate on the site until 2006, when the museum was re-focused towards railways and moved to Saitama, Saitama as the Railway Museum.

In July 2012, work started to redevelop the site, with the original redbrick structure forming the basis of a new office and retail complex scheduled to open in summer 2013. JR East built decks and a cafeteria on the platform and opened shops under the bridge.

Subway station

The Manseibashi subway station was on what is now the Tokyo Metro Ginza Line, situated between the Kanda and Suehirochō stations. It was within the old Kanda Ward, like the JGR station, but on the opposite bank of the Kanda River.
Location:

History
The subway line between Ueno and Asakusa, opened in 1927, was being extended southward. When the extension reached the Kanda River, a temporary subway station was opened at Manseibashi on January 1, 1930. This station was closed again on November 21, 1931 since the line had been extended across the Kanda River to Kanda Station itself.

Current situation

The old subway station is currently (as of 2007) still closed as a station, but the opening remains as a ventilation shaft, emergency exit and maintenance access point for the metro line. The opening and stairs are under grating on the sidewalk in Akihabara, Tokyo's "Electric Town" and a major shopping area for consumer electronics, hobby electronics, manga and anime. One anime series, RahXephon, set some of its important scenes in this station, showing it restored and modernized in 2015.

The station is hard to detect by Ginza Line riders. The ceiling is higher on the station, but very little of the other structure remains.

See also
 History of Tokyo
 Transportation in Greater Tokyo
 Rail transport in Japan

References

External links

 Manseibashi Station construction report 
 Abandoned Stations of Tokyo
 Ginza line station information (Shinbashi - Asakusa) 

Abandoned rapid transit stations
Chūō Main Line
Defunct railway stations in Japan
Railway stations closed in 1943
Railway stations in Tokyo
Railway stations in Japan opened in 1912
Stations of Tokyo Metro
Tokyo Metro Ginza Line